Mithilesh Kumar Thakur is an Indian politician and is member of the Jharkhand Legislative Assembly. He is a member of the Jharkhand Mukti Morcha and represents Garhwa (Assembly constituency) of Jharkhand. He is currently serving as the Cabinet Minister of Jharkhand.

References

Living people
21st-century Indian politicians
Lok Sabha members from Jharkhand
People from Jharkhand
Place of birth missing (living people)
1966 births